The UCF Knights football team represents the University of Central Florida (UCF) in the sport of American football. The Knights compete in the Division I Football Bowl Subdivision (FBS) of the National Collegiate Athletic Association (NCAA) and the American Athletic Conference (The American). Their head coach is Gus Malzahn. The Knights play their home games at the 45,301-seat FBC Mortgage Stadium, which is located on UCF's main campus in Orlando, Florida, United States. 

UCF first fielded a varsity football team in the fall of 1979 as an NCAA Division III program and subsequently completed their ascension to Division I–A, now known as the Division I Football Bowl Subdivision (FBS), in 1996, becoming the first program in NCAA history to have played in all four divisions of football (and the only one until James Madison joined FBS in 2022). As a Division I–AA program, the Knights made the 1990 and 1993 playoffs, and were picked as the preseason No. 1 team to start the 1994 season.

As of the end of the 2021 season, UCF has compiled 278 victories, six division titles, six conference championships, and an undefeated season in 2017. The Knights claim a national championship for the 2017 season despite being excluded from that season's College Football Playoff, as they were chosen as the #1 team by the Colley Matrix.

The Knights have made 14 postseason appearances since joining the FBS, including winning two New Year's Six bowls: the 2014 Fiesta Bowl and the 2018 Peach Bowl. The program has produced one Consensus All-American, Kevin Smith in 2007, and three Heisman Trophy candidates, Daunte Culpepper (QB) in 1998, Kevin Smith (RB) in 2007, and McKenzie Milton (QB) in 2017 and 2018. UCF has produced a long line of accomplished NFL players, including Blake Bortles, A. J. Bouye, Gabe Davis, Shaquill Griffin, Brandon Marshall, Latavius Murray, Matt Prater, Asante Samuel, and Josh Sitton. UCF has had four first-round picks in the NFL Draft, players in 15 Super Bowls, and seven pro-bowlers. The Knights' main rivals are the South Florida Bulls.

History

Early history (1979–1984)
The UCF football program can be traced back to a speech given by the university's second president, Dr. Trevor Colbourn, in January 1979. Colbourn believed that a successful athletics program would bring the university greater renown, and tasked Dr. Jack O'Leary with the job of creating a new football program at the school. In addition, Colbourn changed the name of the school to the University of Central Florida (prior to this, the college was known as Florida Technological University), to express the university's expanded academic scope.

Beginning at the Division III level, O'Leary, then the university's athletic director, held a meeting of prospective players, who paid $14 per night to stay in the dorms and brought their own uniforms to the tryouts, in March 1979. This would be the first football tryouts for prospective players, and would serve as the first that many students would hear about the new athletic program. O'Leary had previously served as an assistant coach at Alabama under Paul "Bear" Bryant. He would spearhead the effort to raise more than $40,000 to start the program, and would complete a deal for the team to play in the Tangerine Bowl. Without a budget to hire a staff, O'Leary reached out to six UCF graduate students as volunteer assistants. From there, O'Leary was able to lure Don Jonas, a former NFL quarterback and Orlando dignitary, to become UCF's first head football coach on a voluntary basis.

One day during a practice, O'Leary pulled the team aside and unveiled the template for uniforms of "The Fighting Knights". He would reveal a template that would follow the team into the 21st century: black jerseys, gold pants and gold helmets. Less than one year after Colbourn had envisioned a football program for the university, UCF played its first game on September 22, 1979, against St. Leo University. The Knights would prove victorious with a 21–0 shutout, and less than a week later, the Knights would win their first home game by defeating Ft. Benning, 7–6. Jonas led the Knights to a 6–2 inaugural season, behind an average attendance of 11,240, including a Division III record crowd of 14,138. Following the season, in March 1980, Jonas was offered the Knights head coaching job as a full-time position. After leading the team to a 4–4–1 and 4–6 record in 1980 and 1981 respectively, Jonas would leave the Knights following the 1981 season. During the 1980 season, the Knights earned the only tie in program history, an 11–all game against Miles, and Tim Kiggins became the first Knight to sign a professional contract. After his departure, Jonas remained involved in the program, including doing radio broadcasts of UCF football games and a radio sports talk show. Jonas led the Knights to a 14–12–1 (.518) record in three seasons.

Following the departure of Don Jonas, Sam Weir, who was the head coach at Lake Howell High School, became UCF's new head coach and led the Knights in their move up to Division II in 1982. Another change to the university's athletic programs in 1982 was the departure of O'Leary as athletic director, and the hiring of Bill Peterson, who was the Florida State head coach from 1960 to 1970. In their first season playing Division II ball, the Knights went 0–10, and Weir decided not to return for the 1983 season. One bright spot of the season was that Mike Carter became the first Knight to sign with an NFL team, the Denver Broncos.

Lou Saban replaced Weir as the Knights head coach in 1983. Saban had previously coached at Miami, Army, Northwestern, and in the AFL and NFL with the Buffalo Bills and Boston Patriots, to name just a few. In UCF's first Black and Gold Spring game held in 1983, the defense won 14–6. The Knights finished the 1983 season 5–6, including the team's first win over a Division I–AA opponent. Starting the 1984 season filled with optimism, the Knights were shaken by a 1–6 start. Following the disappointing beginning to the season, Saban stepped away from the program, and was replaced on an interim basis by assistant coach Jerry Anderson. Saban had a 6–12 (.333) record during his tenure as the Knights head coach. Anderson finished out the year with the team in an interim position, with a 1–3 (.250) record. UCF finished the season with a 2–9 mark. In the course of the three seasons following Jonas' departure, the Knights went through three head coaches, and amassed a 7–25 record.

Gene McDowell era (1985–1997)
Reeling after a disappointing string of seasons, there were discussions within the community about the possibility of dismantling the program, and Peterson announced his retirement as the university's athletic director. In addition, due to financial troubles, the team had to postpone plans to move up to Division I-AA. Without a head coach or athletic director, President Colbourn hired Florida State assistant coach Gene McDowell to fill both positions. McDowell took the helm in 1985, and hired his eventual successor and former Pittsburgh Steelers quarterback Mike Kruczek as his offensive coordinator. The Knights would finish with a 4–7 mark in McDowell's first year, including a 21–42 loss to UCF's first-ever Division I–A opponent, Louisville. Due to financial hardships, McDowell waived half of his annual salary, and FSU head coach Bobby Bowden donated uniforms and cleats to the program.

McDowell would the lead the Knights to their first winning season since 1979, with a 6–5 record in 1986. Also that year, Ted Wilson became the first UCF player to be selected in the 1987 NFL Draft, being picked by the Washington Redskins in the 10th round. Following an 8–3 regular season record in 1987, the Knights earned their first trip to the Division II playoffs, where they earned a 1–1 record. After starting the 1988 season with five straight wins, UCF would be ranked No. 2 in Division II. During a game against the defending D-II national champions Troy at the Citrus Bowl, UCF fans were so loud at one point that the Trojans quarterback Bob Godsey couldn't call plays. Godsey complained to the referee about the crowd noise, but instead of helping Troy, the referee called a delay of game penalty on the Trojans. The "Noise Penalty" game is legendary at UCF, and the win over Troy thrust the Knights into the position as the No. 1 ranked team in D-II. Between 1986 and 1990 under the leadership of McDowell, the Knights held a 24–6 record at the Citrus Bowl.

During McDowell's tenure, the program moved up to Division I-AA in 1990. In their first year in the division, the Knights earned a 10–4 record, a program best, and a trip to the I–AA playoffs. UCF would make it to the semifinals, and became the first school in history to qualify for the I–AA playoffs in its first season of eligibility. The Knights would finish the 1991 and 1992 with winning seasons as well. In 1992, Dr. John Hitt, UCF's fourth president, announced that the program would make the move to Division I-A in 1996, and he hired Steve Sloan as the university's new athletic director. Earning their eighth winning season in 1993, the Knights would again make the playoffs. During the season, the team won their first game over a Division I–A team, a 38–16 victory at Louisiana Tech. After another impressive season, UCF was selected as the preseason No. 1 to start the 1994 season. The 1994 season would prove disappointing however, as the Knights would finish the season ranked No. 20 with a 7–4 record. During the team's final season in Division I-AA, the Knights were reinvigorated by freshman sensation Daunte Culpepper. The quarterback would lead the Knights to a 6–5 record, and their tenth straight winning season in 1995.

On September 1, 1996, UCF officially made its foray into Division I-A. At that time, the Knights became the first football program to play in four different NCAA divisions (III, II, I-AA and I-A). In their first two seasons in Division I-A, the Knights posted identical 5–6 records behind Culpepper. In 1997, assistant coach Alan Gooch was named the national assistant coach of the year, due to his work with deaf running back Dwight Collins. In the wake of a federal fraud scandal revolving around improper cellular phone benefits and use, McDowell resigned as head coach on January 20, 1998. Over his 13-year tenure at UCF, McDowell earned an 86–61 (.585) record.

Mike Kruczek era (1998–2003)
After the abrupt departure of Gene McDowell, offensive coordinator Mike Kruczek was named UCF's new head coach on an interim basis. He would receive the position permanently later in 1998. Daunte Culpepper led UCF to its best season ever with a 9–2 record in 1998 (with losses only coming to Purdue and Auburn). Culpepper finished 6th in the Heisman Trophy voting and set the NCAA record for completion percentage that year (73.4%). Following the season, Culpepper was drafted with the 11th pick in the first round of the 1999 NFL Draft by the Minnesota Vikings, marking the highest ever draft pick of a UCF player.

The Knights proved to be a scary team on the road against heavily favored opponents, with close losses including a 10–6 loss at Auburn in 1998, a 24–23 loss at Georgia in 1999, and a 21–17 loss at Georgia Tech in 2000. Kruczek's biggest victory would come in 2000 against Alabama at Bryant–Denny Stadium in Tuscaloosa, Alabama, when the Knights won 40–38 on a last-second field goal by Javier Beorlegui. After finishing 9–2 in 1998, UCF received a tentative verbal agreement to play in the inaugural Oahu Bowl. That arrangement, however, was contingent on UCLA finishing the season undefeated; the Oahu Bowl was otherwise committed to taking a team from the Pac-10. On the final day of the regular season, Miami upset UCLA, setting off a chain reaction that sent Washington to the Oahu Bowl and left the Knights out in the cold.

Kruczek guided the team as a Division I-A independent until 2002. After six difficult years as an independent, UCF played its much-anticipated first season as a football-only member of the Mid-American Conference in 2002. They finished runner-up in the East division with a 6–2 conference record. They finished the season 7–5 overall, completing their 14th winning season in the past 17 years. The excitement, however, would be short-lived. After signing a three-year contract extension at the beginning of the 2003 season, Kruczek was fired following a 3–7 start. Kruczek was replaced on an interim basis by assistant coach and former player Alan Gooch who finished out the dismal 3–9 season with losses to Mid-American Conference rivals Marshall and Miami (OH). The Marshall game marked UCF's first nationally televised home football game as it was aired on ESPN2. Kruczek ended his six-year stewardship of UCF with a 36–30 (.545) record.

An increased travel burden, lack of competitiveness, and lack of natural rivals within the midwest-based MAC saw UCF begin to explore the possibility of a different conference affiliation after just a couple years in the conference. Furthermore, the UCF athletic department was interested in an all-sports conference membership rather than a football-only affiliation. In 2003, UCF was invited as an all-sports member of Conference USA beginning with the 2005 season.

George O'Leary era (2004–2015)

Following the disappointing 2003 season, Minnesota Vikings defensive coordinator and former Georgia Tech head coach George O'Leary was named UCF's head coach in 2004. This was a controversial and bold hire because O'Leary had previously left Georgia Tech after the 2001 season and been named head coach at Notre Dame, but resigned in disgrace five days into his tenure after inconsistencies were found on his resume. The difficult coaching transition for 2004, the Knights' final year in the Mid-American Conference, saw the team hit rock bottom, going 0–11.

Conference USA
In 2005, UCF started their first season as a member of Conference USA. Not expected to improve much over 2004, they surprisingly won their first conference game against Marshall, 23–13, ending the school's 17-game losing streak, then the nation's longest such streak. UCF fans celebrated by storming the field and tearing down the goal posts. Students came back to the campus and celebrated further by jumping into UCF's Reflection Pond (a practice normally reserved for Spirit Splash). UCF then went on to win eight out of the remaining nine games on their schedule, finishing 7–1 in C-USA games and 8–5 overall, winning the East Division and hosting the first ever C-USA Championship game, which they lost, 44–27, to Tulsa. Shortly thereafter, UCF was invited to play in their first ever bowl game, the Hawaii Bowl, losing to Nevada 49–48 in overtime due to a missed PAT that would have tied the game. In 2005 O'Leary was chosen by SportsIllustrated.com for the coach of the year award and received votes for the larger Bobby Dodd Coach of the Year Award. In May 2006, UCF extended O'Leary's contract for 10 years and increased his pay to $1 million plus incentives per year after he engineered the fourth-best single-season turnaround in college football history.

2007
After an anemic 2006 which saw the Golden Knights go a mere 4–8, the team rebranded in 2007 in preparation for its move to its new on-campus venue, Bright House Networks Stadium (later known as Spectrum Stadium and now as FBC Mortgage Stadium). They dropped the "Golden" from their name, becoming the "UCF Knights". Fortunes seemed to have changed as the Knights moved into new facilities. After defeating a BCS AQ conference school for just the second time ever, NC State by a score of 25–23, they inaugurated their new stadium by hosting and losing to national power No. 6 Texas by a score of 35–32. The Knights lost to archrival South Florida by a score of 64–12 in Tampa, but went on to have a 10–4 overall record and won the C-USA East again, hosting the Championship game against Tulsa once more. UCF defeated Tulsa in a near-reversal of the 2005 Conference USA Championship Game 44–25, thereby gaining UCF's first ever Conference Championship title and a berth in the 2007 Liberty Bowl. Following UCF's victory, the Knights received 35 votes in the AP Poll, but did not reach the top 25, ranking 27th. The Knights lost the Liberty Bowl in Memphis, Tennessee by a score of 10–3 to Mississippi State. The Knights went on to finish the year with its first 10 win season in the FBS. In 2007, Kevin Smith set an NCAA record with 450 rushing attempts and rushed for 2,567 yards, placing him 2nd on the NCAA's all-time single season rushing list behind only Oklahoma State's Barry Sanders. Despite this, he was not selected even as a finalist for the Doak Walker Award. He also was the only running back in the 2007 season to rush for more than 100 yards against the Texas Longhorns. He was a fan favorite, especially with student section at Bright House Networks Stadium. Smith originally stated that he would return for his senior season at UCF, however, he later changed his mind, announcing on January 6, 2008, that he would declare for the 2008 NFL Draft. He was selected with the first pick in the third round by the Detroit Lions.

2008
On March 18, 2008, running back Ereck Plancher collapsed shortly after a conditioning drill, and was then transported to a nearby hospital where he died approximately one hour later. ESPN's Outside The Lines program on November 2, 2008, interviewed players who were at the training session at which Plancher became ill, and which after he died, and stated that the session was longer and far more rigorous than O'Leary and other UCF Athletics officials have admitted to publicly. They also alleged that O'Leary and other coaches had initially warned players off from providing assistance to Plancher when he became visibly distressed. After a 14-day trial in 2011, a jury found the UCF Athletics Association guilty of negligence in the death of Plancher. The jury awarded each of his parents $5 million. Upon appeal, however, the Florida Supreme Court sided with the University of Central Florida, ruling that sickle-cell disease caused the death and the university didn't owe any money to Plancher's family.

2009
After a lackluster 4–8 season in 2008, UCF bounced back with an 8–5 record in 2009, including winning their last six straight C-USA games. Among those wins was their first victory over a nationally ranked team, beating then No. 12 Houston on November 14 by a score of 37–32 at Spectrum Stadium. UCF finished with a 45–24 loss to Rutgers in the St. Petersburg Bowl, their third bowl appearance in five years. Entering the 2010 season, with the recruitment of Jeffrey Godfrey and return of key seniors, including Bruce Miller, there were high hopes for the Knights. After winning 5 straight games, and posting an 11-game conference winning streak, the Knights were ranked for the first time in school history following their nationally televised 40–33 victory over Houston on the road. For the polls released on November 7, 2010, UCF was ranked in all three major college polls. The Knights were ranked 25 in the AP Poll, 23 in the USA Today Coaches Poll and 25 in the Harris Poll. In their first game as a nationally ranked squad, the Knights fell 31–21 to Southern Miss in Orlando. UCF would bounce back and defeat Tulane by a score of 61–14 and Memphis by a score of 37–17. With the wins, the Knights secured the C-USA Eastern Division championship and reentered the polls.

2010
The Knights would go on to win the 2010 Conference USA championship game, defeating SMU 17–7. Following the win, UCF entered the BCS standings for the first time in program history, ranking No. 25. The Knights ended the 2010 season with a 10–6 victory over Georgia in the AutoZone Liberty Bowl, marking the team's first-ever bowl victory. UCF would end the season ranked 20th in the final coaches poll and 21st in the final AP rankings.

2011
2011 proved to be a disappointing season as UCF finished with a 5–7 record and were not bowl eligible for the first time since 2008. The season included out-of-conference losses to FIU and BYU, as well as conference losses to then-winless UAB, a 1-point loss to No. 23 Southern Miss and the continuation of the Knights woes at quarterback, as Jeff Godfrey and Blake Bortles battled for playing time. Following the 2011 season, Jeff Godfrey planned on transferring, though he later decided to return to the Knights as a wide receiver.

Invitation to Big East 
It was announced on December 7, 2011, that UCF would join the Big East Conference, but was rebranded the American Athletic Conference soon thereafter, in all sports beginning in 2013.

Following an investigation into recruiting violations in the men's basketball and football programs in 2011, on July 31, 2012, the NCAA announced sanctions – in addition to penalties UCF had previously self-imposed. The NCAA imposed a one-year postseason football ban. The penalty was in addition to a $50,000 fine, adding two years to UCF's previously proposed three years' probation, reduction of football scholarships, and tighter limits of football recruiting visiting days.

2012
In 2012, the Knights finished 10–4 and won their fourth C-USA East Division championship, though they would fall 33–27 in overtime to Tulsa in the league title game. UCF would play in the 2012 Beef 'O' Brady's Bowl and win 38–17 over Ball State as quarterback Blake Bortles would be named the game's MVP after throwing four touchdown passes.

2013
On April 19, 2013, UCF won its appeal with the NCAA and was eligible for postseason play in 2013. The appeal would prove crucial, as in 2013, O'Leary led the Knights to their first twelve-win season (12–1), first perfect conference record (8–0), first win against a Big Ten opponent (Penn State), first win against a Top–10 team (No. 8 Louisville), third conference title, and the program's first appearance and victory in a BCS bowl game, defeating No. 6 Baylor 52–42 in the 2014 Fiesta Bowl. The game was one of the biggest upsets of the BCS era. On January 7, 2014, UCF was ranked No. 10 in the season's final AP Poll, the highest ranking in school history. Blake Bortles would be drafted in the first round at third overall by the Jacksonville Jaguars in the 2014 NFL Draft.

2014
The Knights finished 9–4 in 2014. The Knights kicked off the season in Dublin, Ireland against Penn State, losing to the Nittany Lions by a score of 26–24. O'Leary's squad dropped to 0–2 after losing to No. 20 Missouri by a score of 38–10. Central Florida then won its next five; defeating FCS foe Bethune–Cookman, Houston, BYU in overtime, Tulane and Temple. The Knights' five-game winning streak was snapped with a 37–29 loss to UConn on November 1. UCF won its next four to close the regular season; topping Tulsa, SMU, archrival South Florida and East Carolina, where a last-second Hail Mary pass earned UCF a shared conference title. O'Leary's Knights accepted a bid to the 2014 St. Petersburg Bowl, a game they lost to NC State by a score of 34–27.

2015
The 2015 season, which began with high hopes, would be a disaster. After dropping their first three, UCF lost to South Carolina by a score of 31–14 on September 26 to fall to 0–4. Following UCF's 59–10 loss to Houston on homecoming, dropping the Knights to an 0–8 record to start the 2015 season, O'Leary resigned as head football coach. Quarterbacks coach Danny Barrett was named interim head coach and led the team for the remaining four games of the season. UCF finished the 2015 season at a winless 0–12, its third such campaign in program history.

Scott Frost era (2016–2017)

After an extensive coaching search, Oregon offensive coordinator Scott Frost was named as UCF's tenth head coach on December 1, 2015. Serving under head coach Mark Helfrich, Frost had overseen one of college football's quickest and most explosive offenses at Oregon, won multiple Pac-12 conference championships, coached quarterback Marcus Mariota into a Heisman Trophy winner in 2014 and sent many players into the National Football League. All this after a successful collegiate playing career at quarterback for Stanford and Nebraska in the 1990s and in the National Football League as a safety for five years.

2016
In 2016, Frost and his explosive, up-tempo offense led the Knights to a 6–7 record. UCF began the Frost era with a 38–0 shutout win over FCS opponent South Carolina State. After losing its next two to Big Ten opponents No. 5 Michigan in a rout and Maryland in double overtime, the Knights defeated FIU and East Carolina. Central Florida then suffered a close 26–25 loss due to a late touchdown pass to Temple on October 15. The Knights rebounded the following week to defeat UConn by a score of 24–16. UCF suffered a defeat on October 29 to Houston, then responded with wins over Tulane and Cincinnati, gaining bowl eligibility. Frost's squad concluded the regular season with losses to Tulsa and archrival South Florida. The Knights lost to Arkansas State in the 2016 Cure Bowl by a score of 31–13. After the 2016 season, Oregon fired Mark Helfrich. Amidst rumors that he might be interested in the Ducks opening, Frost announced he was not interested in Oregon and that he would return as UCF's head coach in 2017. Ironically, the position eventually went to UCF's rival coach, South Florida head coach Willie Taggart.

2017
Surprising even himself, Frost and his team went on to an undefeated regular season in 2017, defeating FIU, Maryland, Memphis, Cincinnati, East Carolina, Navy, Austin Peay, SMU, UConn, Temple, and rival USF in a War on I-4 shootout. The Knights were supposed to play Memphis on September 9, but due to Hurricane Irma battering the state of Florida that weekend, the game, which originally had been moved up one day to September 8, was rescheduled for September 30. In order to reschedule the American Athletic Conference game, UCF canceled their scheduled game with Georgia Tech, leaving the team with only 11 regular season games as opposed to the usual 12. The breakout season for Frost and his team made him one of the most sought-after coaches on the market, drawing interest from Florida and his alma mater, Nebraska. Frost passed on the Florida job but avoided questions about returning to Nebraska. In the 2017 American Athletic Conference Football Championship Game, Frost's team went on to play Memphis for the second time and won the title in a 62–55 double overtime thriller, securing UCF's third conference championship win.

Just hours after winning the AAC, sources confirmed that Frost would be taking a seven-year, $35 million deal to become Nebraska's new head coach. Frost and his staff returned for one last game in the 2018 Peach Bowl. The No. 12 ranked Knights faced No. 7 ranked Auburn, and defeated them 34–27 to close out their undefeated season with a 13–0 record. After the win, UCF athletic director Danny White claimed a national championship for the team, while the Colley Matrix also ranked UCF as the number-one team of the season on its final ranking. The team celebrated with a parade at Walt Disney World. Additionally, the team's coaches were paid bonuses for their performance, the school hung a national championship banner in Spectrum Stadium and gave out national champion rings. The claim sparked considerable controversy and debate over whether the College Football Playoff should be expanded.

Josh Heupel era (2018–2020)
On December 5, 2017, Missouri offensive coordinator Josh Heupel was named UCF's head football coach. Heupel arrived in Orlando with some impressive credentials, overseeing explosive offenses during his time as offensive coordinator at Missouri and his alma mater Oklahoma. UCF signed Heupel to a five-year contract worth a fully guaranteed $1.7 million in annual base salary.

2018
In Heupel's first season, UCF rode its high-powered offense to start the season 12–0 and extend their winning streak to a school-record 25 games. In their rivalry game at South Florida, star quarterback McKenzie Milton suffered a gruesome knee injury and was taken straight to the hospital, eventually requiring multiple surgeries to save the leg. Milton was out for the season, and never played another down for UCF, transferring to Florida State after the 2020 season and playing his final season of eligibility there in 2021. Back-up quarterback Darriel Mack Jr. took over and guided the Knights to win that game as well as the Conference championship game a week later against Memphis. The undefeated and 8th-ranked Knights were once again not selected for the College Football Playoff. Without Milton, the Knights lost a close game against LSU in the Fiesta Bowl.

2019
In Heupel's second season, UCF lost a regular season game for the first time since 2016, at Pitt. UCF also fell on the road to Cincinnati, whose fans promptly rushed the field to celebrate. UCF dropped out of the Top 25 for the first time in two years. UCF finished the season defeating Marshall in the Gasparilla Bowl.

2020
In Heupel's third and final season, UCF started the season ranked, but lost three games in the regular season, including their first home loss since 2016 (snapping a 21-game home winning streak). They posted a winning record for the fourth straight year, but were blown out by BYU in the Boca Raton Bowl.

On January 27, 2021, Heupel was hired to coach the Tennessee Volunteers by Tennessee's new athletic director, the same Danny White who had hired Heupel at UCF.

Gus Malzahn era (2021–)
On February 15, 2021, new athletic director Terry Mohajir named Gus Malzahn as UCF's new head coach. The two had previously worked together at Arkansas State, and Malzahn made a name for himself with a 68–35 record at Auburn from 2013 to 2020, including three wins over Alabama in the Iron Bowl rivalry, an appearance in the 2014 BCS National Championship Game, and two New Year's Six bowl appearances. His Auburn team lost to UCF in one of those New Year's Six appearances, the 2018 Peach Bowl.

2021
Malzahn won in his debut with the Knights, defeating Boise State, 36–31. Following several critical injuries, including to starting quarterback Dillon Gabriel, Malzahn's first season ended with a 9–4 record (3rd in AAC) including a win against Florida in the Gasparilla Bowl.

In 2022, UCF's final year in The American, Malzahn guided the Knights to a 9–3 regular season record (2nd in AAC). They clinched a spot in the AAC Championship Game, facing Tulane.

Conference affiliations
 NCAA Division III independent (1979–1981)
 NCAA Division II independent (1982–1989)
 NCAA Division I-AA independent (1990–1995)
 NCAA Division I-A independent (1996–2001)
 Mid-American Conference (2002–2004)
 Conference USA (2005–2012)
 American Athletic Conference (2013–2022)
 Big 12 Conference (2023–present)

Championships

National championships
Under head coach Scott Frost, the 2017 Knights completed a 13–0 perfect season.  The Knights were not selected for the College Football Playoff, instead completing their season with a New Years Day win in the 2018 Peach Bowl over the No. 7 Auburn Tigers. On January 7, 2018, the day before the CFP championship game, UCF athletic director Danny White stated that UCF would claim the 2017 national championship, hang a national title banner, and hold a national championship parade and celebration, a move which was lampooned and derided nationally and remains an embarrassment.

On January 9, 2018, the Colley Matrix, an algorithm formerly used as part of the BCS computer rankings, ranked UCF No. 1.  All other NCAA-designated major selectors named Alabama as their 2017 national champion. The NCAA's official record book lists UCF under the "Final National Poll Leaders" section, but the NCAA reserves the term "National Champions" for teams selected as champions by one of the four Consensus Polls (AP, USA Today/Coaches, National Football Foundation, and Football Writers Association of America) or winners of the BCS or College Football Playoff (in other words, ACTUAL CHAMPIONS); and places a disclaimer next to UCF's name which says that since 2014, "the College Football Playoff [has been] used to determine national champions in FBS". While it is not historically uncommon for certain polls to pick a champion other than the BCS or CFP winner, UCF is the only team which actively claims a national championship that was not awarded by the BCS/CFP or the AP Poll since the beginning of the BCS era.

Conference championships
Under George O'Leary's leadership, the Knights won four C-USA Eastern Division Championships (2005, 2007, 2010, 2012), and two Conference USA Championships (2007, 2010). O'Leary also led the Knights to The American conference championship in their first year in the league (2013), earning the conference's automatic berth to a BCS bowl game. In 2014, the Knights clinched back-to-back conference championships. The Knights won The American conference championship in 2017 under head coach Scott Frost, and again in 2018 under head coach Josh Heupel for the program's second set of back-to-back conference titles.

† Co–champion

Division championships
UCF won four division crowns and subsequently made four appearances in the Conference USA Championship Game, more than any other C-USA school, with the last being in 2012. Three of the four appearances were against Tulsa of the Western Division. The Knights went on to win two of the four C-USA Championship Games in which they appeared.

After moving to the AAC, UCF won two more division titles. In 2022, after the AAC had eliminated divisions, UCF qualified for a third AAC Conference Championship Game appearance by finishing as the #2 seed.

† Co–championship

Bowl games

UCF has played in 14 bowl games and has compiled a 6–8 record in those games. Since elevating to Division I FBS, UCF has been bowl-eligible for 16 of 25 seasons, and received their first bowl invitation in 2005. The Knights nearly earned a bowl berth in 1998, when Daunte Culpepper led the team to a 9–2 record. UCF has been ranked going into their bowl game four times, being ranked No. 24 in 2010 (Liberty), No. 15 in 2013 (Fiesta), No. 10 in 2017 (Peach), and No. 7 in 2018 (Fiesta). In 2019, though they had slipped out of the top 25 prior to the game, the Knights won their bowl game (Gasparilla) and placed No. 24 in the final rankings. In 2020, they were ranked No. 21 in the preseason poll and in week 4 they were ranked the highest at No. 11 but lost to unranked Tulsa and they fell out of the rankings; in week 16 they were unranked but they received votes, but after a loss in their bowl game (Boca Raton), they didn't receive any votes and were unranked in the final rankings.

Playoffs

NCAA Division I-AA playoffs
The Knights appeared in the Division I–AA playoffs twice with a record of 2–2.

NCAA Division II playoffs
The Knights appeared in the Division II playoffs once with a record of 1–1.

Head coaches
UCF has had 12 head coaches since organized football began in 1979. Gene McDowell, George O'Leary, Scott Frost, and Josh Heupel have led the Knights to the postseason. O'Leary, Frost, and Heupel have coached the team to an FBS conference championship, and a BCS/NY6 bowl game. Before leading UCF in 1983 and 1984, Lou Saban was a head coach in both the American Football League (AFL) and the NFL. O'Leary also coached in the NFL between 2002 and 2004.

† – denotes interim coach

Venues

Citrus Bowl (1979–2006)

Until 2007, the Knights played their home games at the Citrus Bowl (formerly Orlando Stadium, and now Camping World Stadium) in downtown Orlando. The stadium's first college football game was played in January 1947 between Catawba and Maryville. UCF played its first football game at the Citrus Bowl in September 1979, a 7–6 victory over Fort Benning. The facility was the home of the Citrus Bowl, and numerous neutral site games.

By 2004, Orlando city officials and UCF's administration expressed dissatisfaction with the state of the aging facility. While UCF was the primary leasing tenant of the Citrus Bowl for 25 years, they received little revenue from football games, and the stadium's capacity (65,000) was considered too large for the Knights. With an average attendance of 20,000–30,000 spectators per game, the stadium was left with a mostly empty appearance. The Knights' record home attendance of 51,987 (set at the 2005 C-USA Championship) was still far short of capacity. The location off campus was considered a significant factor in the inability to sustain a sizeable student section, while the stadium's upper decks were rarely occupied for UCF games.

When the university approached the city about possible renovations and new revenue-sharing measures for the stadium, they were met with resistance. The city generally wanted UCF to stay, but expected them to help pay for the upgrades to the facility. At one point during the negotiations, stadium officials told then UCF Athletic Director Steve Orsini that "the value of UCF's fans was nothing". Though the city had expressed interest in renovating the Citrus Bowl with or without UCF's support, funding was seriously in doubt. The city was in the planning stages for a new arena, new performing arts center, and "creative village", with stadium renovations seemingly taking less and less priority.

The Knights compiled an overall record of 112–60–1 at the Citrus Bowl, which includes Division II playoff games in 1987, a Division I-AA playoff game in 1990, the 2005 C-USA Championship Game and the 2016 Cure Bowl.

FBC Mortgage Stadium (2007–present) 

In early 2005, as a response to the deteriorating condition of the Citrus Bowl, and lack of revenue derived from the games there, UCF formally proposed building an on-campus stadium. Additional motivations included drawing more students to the games, a more intimate setting, and establishing game-day traditions on campus. In December 2005, the UCF Board of Trustees approved the construction of a new on-campus stadium. The new stadium, at the time named Bright House Networks Stadium, was originally planned to open in time for the 2006 football season, but neighborhood opposition delayed the time frame by a year.

Stadium construction began in 2006 and was finished in time for the 2007 season. The first home-game took place on September 15, 2007, as the Knights nearly upset the No. 6-ranked Texas Longhorns. The current seating capacity of the stadium is 44,206, and plans provide for a future expansion to 65,000 seats. Although the Knights lost their first on-campus home game, they finished the remainder of the stadium's inaugural season undefeated. UCF has hosted the C-USA Championship Game twice, and the AAC Championship Game twice. Following the 2014 season, the stadium underwent an $8 million renovation. The Wayne Densch Center for Student-Athlete Leadership was constructed on the east facade of the stadium, and a party deck known as the "Carl Black and Gold Cabana" was added to the east stands. By many accounts the stadium was built cheaply and as fast as possible. Due to these factors the stadium tends to bounce up and down giving it the nickname "The Bounce House". The stadium was renamed to Spectrum Stadium in April 2017 following Charter Communications acquisition of Bright House Networks. After the naming rights deal with Spectrum expired after the 2019 season, the stadium was renamed Bounce House for the Knights 2020 season.

Just over two weeks before the 2019 season opener, the UCF athletic department announced that the entire season-ticket allotment was sold out for the first time in school history. In addition, they created a formal waiting list for season tickets, also for the first time. In the press release, UCF athletic director Danny White teased a possible expansion of Spectrum Stadium in the near future if ticket demand remains high.

Rivalries

Though UCF remains a relatively young program that has shifted conferences several times, it has several long-standing rivalries with schools throughout the duration of Conference USA and The American. The university's biggest rival historically is their instate rival, the University of South Florida Bulls, played from 2005 to 2008, and since 2013. Other rivalries include the East Carolina University Pirates, Memphis Tigers, and Houston Cougars.

One other unofficial rivalry, known as the Civil Conflict, exists between UCF and UConn. However, UCF does not acknowledge the rivalry, and has publicly dismissed it.

South Florida

The War on I–4 dates years before the two schools ever played a game against each other. The matchup was the subject of much discussion and fan enthusiasm since the 1990s, though the first game was not played until 2005. The rivalry, often known as the "War on I–4" or "I–4 Corridor Clash", continued as a four home-and-away series through the 2008 season. The Bulls won each of the four games, which all drew strong crowds, but South Florida declined to continue the series after 2008. The UCF–South Florida game resumed as a regular conference game beginning with the 2013 season, as UCF joined the American Athletic Conference. The Knights won the first game as conference members 23–20 before 45,952 in Orlando. In 2014, the Knights won for the first time at Raymond James Stadium, and delivered the first home shut-out in South Florida history, 16–0. In 2015, USF defeated the Knights 44–3 to finish a winless season for the Knights. In 2016, the War On I-4 trophy was introduced for the first time. USF took home the trophy by defeating UCF 48–31 and clinching their first 10-win season in school history, only for UCF to take the trophy back from them the following year during their national championship season in 2017.

UCF leads South Florida 8–6 in the football series through the 2022 season.

Cincinnati

Cincinnati and UCF are tied in the series 4-4 since 2019.

Individual awards and honors

All-Americans
Every year, several publications release lists of their ideal "team". The athletes on these lists are referred to as All-Americans. The NCAA recognizes five All-American lists. They are the Associated Press (AP), American Football Coaches Association (AFCA), Football Writers Association of America (FWAA), Sporting News (TSN), and the Walter Camp Football Foundation (WCFF). UCF has had numerous players honored as first team All-Americans. To date, Kevin Smith is the only Consensus All-American.

 Daunte Culpepper – QB, 1997 (NFL Draft Report)
 Kevin Smith – RB, 2007 (AP, FWAA, WCFF, SN, SI, ESPN, CBS Sports, College Football News, Scout.com)
 Joe Burnett – KR, 2008 (ESPN, SI)
 Quincy McDuffie – KR, 2012 (SI)
 Jacoby Glenn – CB, 2014 (AP)
 Mike Hughes – KR, 2017 (FWAA)
 Shaquem Griffin – LB, 2017 (AFCA)

Conference honors
 Coach of the Year
2017: Scott Frost
2013: George O'Leary
2010: George O'Leary
2007: George O'Leary
2005: George O'Leary

 Offensive Player of the Year
2017: McKenzie Milton
2013: Blake Bortles
2007: Kevin Smith

 Defensive Player of the Year
2016: Shaquem Griffin
2014: Jacoby Glenn
2012: Kemal Ishmael
2010: Bruce Miller
2009: Bruce Miller

 Special Teams Player of the Year
2012: Quincy McDuffie
2008: Joe Burnett

 Freshman of the Year
2015: Tre'Quan Smith
2010: Jeff Godfrey
2005: Kevin Smith

Heisman Trophy
Quarterbacks Daunte Culpepper and McKenzie Milton, and running back Kevin Smith are the only Knights to finish in the Top–10 of voting for the Heisman Trophy.

Honored numbers
UCF retires a student-athlete's jersey but does not retire the respective jersey numbers. The Knights coaching staff can choose to reissue a given number, as the retirement of the jersey does not require that the number not be worn again.

 1 Wayne Densch – Philanthropist to the UCF region
 8 Daunte Culpepper – QB, 1995–1998
 19 Joe Burnett – CB, 2005–2008
 24 Kevin Smith – RB, 2005–2007

Other honors
 AFCA Coach of the Year Award – Scott Frost, 2017
 Archie Griffin Award – McKenzie Milton, 2017
 Associated Press College Football Coach of the Year Award – Scott Frost, 2017
 Eddie Robinson Coach of the Year Award – Scott Frost, 2017
 Home Depot Coach of the Year Award – Scott Frost, 2017
 Paul "Bear" Bryant Award – Scott Frost, 2017
 Peter Mortell Holder of the Year Award– Mac Loudermilk, Punter, 2018

Knights in professional football

NFL 

As of December 2021, currently 21 players are on an NFL roster. Which ranks 26th overall out NFL players represented by school. They also lead G5 schools with the most active NFL players.

NFL
 Jordan Akins – TE, Houston Texans
 Blake Bortles – QB, New Orleans Saints
 A. J. Bouye – CB, Carolina Panthers
 Gabe Davis  – WR, Buffalo Bills
 Tay Gowan  – CB, Philadelphia Eagles
 Richie Grant  – S, Atlanta Falcons
 Shaquill Griffin – CB, Jacksonville Jaguars
 Jacob Harris  – WR, Los Angeles Rams
 Mike Hughes – CB, Kansas City Chiefs
 Trysten Hill – DT, Dallas Cowboys
 Charley Hughlett – LS, Cleveland Browns
 Adrian Killins – RB, Denver Broncos
 Justin McCray – OT, Houston Texans
 Wyatt Miller – OT, San Francisco 49ers
 Latavius Murray – RB, Baltimore Ravens
 Tre Nixon – WR, New England Patriots
 Breshad Perriman – WR, Tampa Bay Buccaneers
 Matt Prater – K, Arizona Cardinals
 Aaron Robinson – CB, New York Giants
 Tre'Quan Smith – WR, New Orleans Saints
 Mathew Wright  – K, Kansas City Chiefs

CFL 
 Brandon Alexander – DB, Winnipeg Blue Bombers
 D.J. Killings – DB, 
Calgary Stampeders
 Keith Shologan – DT, Montreal Alouettes

Schedule
UCF is one of eleven current full members of the American Athletic Conference. With the departure of UConn after 2019, the conference contracted to eleven teams for football, and divisions were eliminated. Teams in The American play an eight-game conference schedule (four home games and four away games). The intra-conference opponents are scheduled on a rotating basis.

From 2015 to 2019, football in The American consisted of twelve teams, split into two divisions. UCF was placed in the East Division with Cincinnati, UConn, ECU, South Florida, and Temple. The West Division consisted of Houston, Memphis, SMU, Tulane, Tulsa, and Navy. Intra-division games (five annually) operated on a two-year cycle, as a home-and-home series. Crossover division games operated on a four-year cycle (home-and-home with three teams, followed by home-and-home with the other three).

Future non-conference opponents 
Officially announced out-of-conference schedules as of July 2022 are as follows. When UCF joins the Big 12 Conference in 2023, the conference is expected to maintain a nine-game intra-conference schedule. As such, the Knights are expecting to contest three out-of-conference games annually.

A home-and-home out-of-conference series with BYU was scheduled for 2023–2024. However, it was officially canceled on July 13, 2022, as BYU will also be joining the Big 12 in 2023. Planned meetings versus FIU (2022) and Liberty (2024) were also canceled. The Sam Houston Bearkats, which will enter Division I FBS in 2023 as members of C-USA, will instead play at BYU in 2023, and at UCF in 2024. UCF eventually added Villanova for the vacated 2023 schedule slot.

See also
UCF Knights

Footnotes

References
General:
 Holic, Nathan, and the UCF Alumni Association. University of Central Florida: The Campus History Series (2009), 
 MacCambridge, Michael. ESPN College Football Encyclopedia: The Complete history of the Game (2005), 

In-text:

External links

 

 
American football teams established in 1979
1979 establishments in Florida